Ichneutica semivittata is a moth of the family Noctuidae. It is endemic to New Zealand and can be found from Three King Islands down to Stewart Island. The similar species I. sulcana can be distinguished from I. semivittata as the former is much larger, has a darker hindwing and abdomen and has only on to three spots located behind the middle of the forewing in comparison to the 8 or 9 of I. semivittata. This species lives in a variety of habitats from open grasslands to clearings in forest and at a range of altitudes from the sea level to the alpine zone. Larval host species include Juncus procera, Carex secta as well as on tussock grasses such as Poa cita, P. colensoi and Festuca novae-zelandiae. Adults of this species are on the wing from August to April and are attracted to light.

Taxonomy 
This species was first described by Francis Walker in 1865 using a male specimen collected in Nelson by T. R. Oxley. Walker originally named the species Leucania semivittata. J. S. Dugdale discussed this species in his 1988 catalogue and placed it within the Tmetolophota genus. In 2019 Robert Hoare undertook a major review of New Zealand Noctuidae. During this review the genus Ichneutica was greatly expanded and the genus Tmetolophota was subsumed into that genus as a synonym. As a result of this review, this species is now known as Ichneutica semivittata.

Description 

George Hudson described the larvae of I. semivittata as follows:

Walker described the adults of this species as follows:

The wingspan of the adult male of this species is between 30 and 42 mm and for the female is between 31 and 40 mm. This species is distinctive and can be distinguished from other species as it has a reddish ochreous streak on the forewing. The similar species I. sulcana can be distinguished from I. semivittata as the former is much larger, has a darker hindwing and abdomen and has only on to three spots located behind the middle of the forewing in comparison to the 8 or 9 of I. semivittata.

Distribution 
It is endemic to New Zealand. The species can be found from Three Kings Islands down to and including Stewart Island.

Habitat 
This species lives in a variety of habitats from open grasslands to clearings in forest and at a range of altitudes from the sea level to the alpine zone. It is relatively rare in the tussock grasslands of the MacKenzie country and in Canterbury.

Behaviour 
Adults of this species are on the wing from August to April and are attracted to light.

Life history and host species 

Larval host species include Juncus procera, Carex secta as well as on tussock grasses such as Poa cita, P. colensoi and Festuca novae-zelandiae.

References

Hadeninae
Moths of New Zealand
Endemic fauna of New Zealand
Moths described in 1865
Taxa named by Francis Walker (entomologist)
Endemic moths of New Zealand